Tempo (also known as Vidal & Sohn Tempo-Werke GmbH), was a German automobile manufacturer based in Hamburg. The company was founded by Oscar Vidal in 1924.

The company was well known in Germany, producing popular vans like the Matador and the Hanseat. Tempo also produced small military vehicles during the 1930s and 1940s.

History 

Tempo was founded as Vidal & Sohn Tempo-Werke in 1924. During the 1940s, Tempo produced small military vehicles. Post-war the requirement of the Bundesgrenzschutz, in West Germany, to acquire a suitable vehicle for Border patrol led to production of the 80" and 86" Tempo from 1953 to 1957. The Tempo 80" and 86" were built using a rolling chassis from Land Rover, but attempts to continue production with the 88" and 109" models were not successful.

In 1958, Firodia Ltd, an Indian manufacturer of cars (later acquired by Bajaj Tempo, renamed since 2005 to Force Motors), started the production of Hanseat three-wheeled cars with the collaboration of Tempo-Werke. Later on, Tempo introduced the Matador, which (along with the Hanseat) was extremely popular in India where it was used as goods carrying vehicles. The four-wheeled Matador remained under production by Tempo from 1949 until 1967.

In 1966, Tempo partnered with Hanomag AG, the produced vehicles were sold under the name of Hanomag. From 1967 to 1970 the vehicles were sold under the new name "Hanomag-Henschel". In 1971, Hanomag-Henschel, and within Tempo, was purchased by Daimler-Benz AG. Tempo remained on the production of vans until 1977. From 1966 to 1977, all vehicles produced by Tempo were sold under a different name, either Hanomag, Rheinstahl-Hanomag, Hanomag-Henschel, or Mercedes-Benz.

Various Tempo vehicles were once extremely common as goods carrying vehicle on the streets of Indian cities where the Indian company marketed them.

Vehicles by Tempo

The first tricycles
The first tempo tricycles were created from a combination of motorcycle and flatbed, which was in front of the driver. In the further development, the cab was moved in front of the bunk or box. The tempo tricycles are equipped with single-cylinder or two-cylinder two-stroke Otto engines—the 400cc 12 hp Tempo A in 1938, for example. The engine drives the front wheel through a transmission and a chain. The engine, the transmission, the load-bearing chain box, and the front wheel are hinge-connected to the rest of the vehicle as an integrated pivotable part.

Off-road vehicle
The SUV Tempo G 1200 was produced from 1936 to 1944. In 1936, Otto Daus developed this off-road vehicle for Tempo with two engines (one in front and one in the back) and four-wheel drive. The two-stroke engines each had 19 hp and drove each one axle.

Tempo Matador and Tempo Wiking

Parallel to the Hanseat came the Tempo four-wheel delivery van Matador and Wiking in the program. In contrast to the similar van, Volkswagen released at about the same time 0.75-ton VW T1, the direct competitor of Matador. The first Matador from 1949 (whose front-end was compared with a boxer's face) were powered by 25-horsepower VW industrial engines sourced directly from VW. Since Tempo had failed to conclude a long-term supply contract with the managing director of VW, Heinz Nordhoff. In 1952, the delivery of this engine stopped to the company at short notice. Thereafter, the Matador was fitted with either a two-stroke of 672 cc or a four-cycle engine (1092 cc, 34 hp), both of which came from the engineering office of Müller in Andernach. In 1953, the Wiking came on to the market, a 3/4 ton (up to 850 kg payload) truck with a  452 cc two-stroke Heinkel engine. The Wiking was built until 1955. The Wiking-based Rapid is a minibus which was built from 1957 to 1963. The Rapid was powered by a 948 cc and  engine supplied by the Austin Motor Company.

Licensed production by other companies 

 In Spain Tempo Onieva, later taken over by Barreiros, made Tempo Viking vans and light trucks featuring Barreiros diesel engines.
 In Uruguay Tempo Viking and Matador were made by Germania Motors.
 In the UK, Jensen Motors made the Tempo Matador too, known as Tempo 1500 or Jensen Front Wheel Drive, starting in 1958.
 In India the Tempo Hanseat remained under production by Bajaj Tempo under the name Bajaj Tempo Hanseat from 1962 to 2000 ("Force" in latter years).
 Australia The Jolus Minx 1963-65 F1 car used suspension and cut down drive shafts from the Matador.
Goliath motors ltd in Bremen (Part of the Borgward-group) also produced a three-wheeler until 1961, but this was not a version of the Hanseat.

Models 
Tempo, light commercial vehicles (LCV):
T 1, T2 = 1928-1930
T 6 = 1929-1935
T 10 = 1930-1936
Pony = 1932-1936
Front 6 = 1933-1934
Front 7, 10, 14 = 1934-1935
Front 9, 12 = 1933-1935
D 200, D 400 = 1935-1936
V 600 = 1935-1936
E 200, E 400, E 600 = 1936-1937
A 200 Resolut = 1938-1940
A 600 Titan = 1938-1943
A 400 Athlet = 1938-1948
Hanseat = 1949-1956
Boy = 1950-1956
Matador / Mayor = 1949-1952 - 13521 of these vehicles were built using a 25 hp Volkswagen 1100 cc motor and ZF gearbox. The incoming Typ 2 Volkswagen led Wolfsburg to cease supply of the engine, ending the model run and forcing Tempo to return to two-stroke engines.
Matador 1000, 1400 / Mayor 1000, 1400 = 1952-1955
Wiking / Viking = 1953-1955
Wiking 1 / Viking 1 = 1955-1963
Matador 1 / Mayor 1 Jensen Tempo 1500 = 1955-1963
Rapid = 1957-1963
Matador E / Mayor E = 1963-1966
Tempo off-road cars:
T 1200 = 1935
G 1200 = 1936-1943
Tempo Land Rover = 1953-1958
Daus 214 = 1958
Tempo cars:
2/3 Sitzer front 6-14 = 1934-1935
Kombinationswagen (400, 600) = 1935-1940
Kleinwagen A = 1955
Kleinwagen B = 1956
Kleinwagen Y = 1957
Hanomag production:
Athlet, Matador / Mayor = 1966-1967
F20 - 36 = 1967-1970(75) (in India as the Tempo Matador)
Daimler-Benz production
L 206 / 307 = 1971-1977

See also 
DKW Schnellaster
Hanomag
Mercedes-Benz
Force Motors, formerly Bajaj Tempo, produced Hanomag products in India.

External links 
 Tempo Dienst - 
 Tempo club Germany (Membership needed) - 

Defunct motor vehicle manufacturers of Germany
Three-wheeled motor vehicles